Østfold Hospital Trust is a health trust in Norway with bases in Fredrikstad, Moss, Sarpsborg and Halden. It is owned by Southern and Eastern Norway Regional Health Authority.

External links
Official website

Health trusts of Norway